The Volga Star is a Dmitriy Furmanov-class (project 302, BiFa129M) Soviet/Russian river cruise ship, cruising in the Volga – Neva basin. The ship was built by VEB Elbewerften Boizenburg/Roßlau at their shipyard in Boizenburg, East Germany, and entered service in 1983. From 2011 to February 2019 the ship was named after Russian, and later French and American, composer, pianist and conductor Igor Stravinsky.

Her home port is currently Rostov-on-Don. Captain of the Igor Stravinskiy (2011) is Gennady Cherkashin.

Features
The ship has two restaurants, "Vena" and "Sankt-Peterburg", two bars, conference hall, sauna and library.

See also
 List of river cruise ships

References

External links

Igor Stravinskiy (Project-302) on Orthodox

1983 ships
River cruise ships
Ships built in East Germany
Passenger ships of the Soviet Union
Ships of Ukraine
Passenger ships of Russia
Ships of Russia
Igor Stravinsky